George Bradley (born 1953 in Roslyn, New York) is an American poet, editor, and fiction writer whose work is characterized by formal structure, humor, and satirical narrative.

Life
Bradley was raised on Long Island and has lived in Virginia, New York City, Italy and Connecticut and attended The Hill School, Yale University, and the University of Virginia. He has worked variously in construction, as a sommelier, as an editor and as a copywriter. At present, he imports and distributes a brand of olive oil (La Bontà di Fiesole) produced in Tuscany. He is married to Spencer Boyd, and they have one child, Beatrice Boyd Bradley.

George Bradley's poems have appeared in The New Yorker, Poetry, New England Review, The New Republic, The Paris Review, The American Poetry Review, The Hartford Courant, Partisan Review, Southwest Review, America Illustrated, Western Humanities Review, Open City, Shenandoah, Verse (US and UK), Spazio Umano (Italy), Literary Imagination, The American Scholar, Raritan, and Almanacco (Italy) among other publications. Bradley's prose, including fiction and literary criticism, has been published in The Yale Review, Southwest Review, The American Scholar, The Houston Chronicle, and elsewhere.

Awards
 1985: Yale Younger Poets Series, selected by James Merrill
 1990: The Peter I. B. Lavan Award from the Academy of American Poets
 1990: National Endowment for the Arts Grant
 1992: The Witter Bynner Prize from the American Academy and Institute of Arts and Letters

Works
In 1998 he edited The Yale Younger Poets Anthology, which traced the history of the first poetry series in America from its inception in 1919 to 1997. The critic Peter Davison praised this anthology in the Atlantic Monthly for uncovering an important chapter of American literary history: Bradley "introduces each selection with a brief identification of its author, and prefaces his anthology with introductory matter amounting to nearly a hundred pages of graceful, witty, and discriminating prose that combines aesthetic perception, historical understanding, and publishing shrewdness. The result is a book that illuminates the recesses between artists, audiences, public taste, and the history of American publication."

Poetry

Anthologies

Translations

References

1953 births
Living people
Poets from New York (state)
People from Roslyn, New York
University of Virginia alumni
Yale University alumni
The Hill School alumni